A Progressive Conservative Party of Ontario leadership election was held on October 25, 1961 to replace retiring Progressive Conservative leader and incumbent premier Leslie Frost.  The party selected John Robarts on the sixth ballot.

First ballot:

ROBERTS, Kelso 352
ROBARTS, John 345
MACAULAY, Robert 339
ALLAN, James 332
DOWNER, A.W. 149
DYMOND, Matthew 148
WARDROPE, George 45

Second ballot:

ROBARTS, John 423
ROBERTS, Kelso 385
MACAULAY, Robert 363
ALLAN, James 324
DOWNER, A.W. 104
DYMOND, Matthew 93

Third ballot:

ROBARTS, John 498
ROBERTS, Kelso 380
MACAULAY, Robert 372
ALLAN, James 344
DOWNER, A.W. 93

Fourth ballot:

ROBARTS, John 533
ROBERTS, Kelso 419
MACAULAY, Robert 377
ALLAN, James 336

Fifth ballot:

ROBARTS, John 746
ROBERTS, Kelso 479
MACAULAY, Robert 438

Sixth ballot:

ROBARTS, John 976
ROBERTS, Kelso 633

See also:  Progressive Conservative Party of Ontario leadership conventions

References

1961
1961 elections in Canada
Progressive Conservative Party of Ontario leadership election
October 1961 events in Canada